Nasrul Suhaimin bin Saifuddin (born 27 September 1978), known professionally as Bront Palarae, is a Malaysian actor, screenwriter, film director, and producer.

Following early roles in Lang Buana(2003) & and as guitarist for The Velvet Boys in Man Laksa, Bront built his career in the early 2000s with roles in Castello, Bilut, Tipah Tertipu The Movie & 1957: Hati Malaya. His collaboration with director Mamat Khalid resulted in the films Man Laksa (2006) & Kala Malam Bulan Mengambang (2008). They also co-wrote the script together for Tipah Tertipu The Movie (2006).

Bront won his accolade for his portrayal of a private investigator in Belukar (2010). He was the Producer of One Two Jaga (2018), which won 6 awards including Best Pictures at 30th Malaysia Film Festival.

Early life and education
Bront was born in Alor Setar, Kedah, Malaysia. He has a sister, Rita, and a brother, Anwar. He attended Kolej Sultan Abdul Hamid, Alor Setar. Bront went on to study Films at the Malaysia Film Academy in 1999 and graduated in 2003.

In 2005, he received a scholarship from the Italian government to attend a short course in Language & Culture at the University for Foreigners Perugia, Italy. He overstayed and toured the country for the next four months.

He took another sabbatical in 2017, this time, he chose Palo Alto, California as his destination. With a scholarship from Ministry of Finance Malaysia, he pursued and completed Innovation & Entrepreneurship Studies at Stanford University.

Acting career

2000–2008: Early years
Palarae made his acting debut on television in 2000, Mat Nor Kusyairi & The Velvet Boys, directed by Mamat Khalid and Produced by Puan Sri Tiara Jacquelina. His collaboration with Mamat Khalid brought him onto his first feature film Lang Buana (2003). He first gained fame by portraying two characters in Cinta Tsunami, a television series in 2005.

In 2008, with the release of his biggest commercial success, SinDarEla (Cinderella), he rose to prominence in a lead role, Hussin on the hit television series with Sharifah Amani and Remy Ishak, followed by another television series, Rona Roni Makaroni in the same year, again with Sharifah Amani. Both projects directed by Shahrulezad Muhyiddin.

2009–2015: Breaking into film
Uncomfortable with his career direction, the media-shy actor turned his focus to film roles. Since then, he started attracting a variety of roles in films including Anak Halal (2005), Man Laksa (2005) and Bilut (2005). His first major role was in V3: Samseng Jalanan, starring alongside his good friend, Farid Kamil who also directed the movie. V3: Samseng Jalanan grossed over RM4.1 million at the box office.

In 2009, Palarae starred in Belukar alongside Daphne Iking, directed by Jason Chong. Though the movie did not do well at the box office, his acting was praised among critics and audiences alike. He won the Best Actor award at the 23rd Malaysia Film Festival and also the Anugerah Skrin 2010 for his performance in Belukar.

In 2010, Palarae co-founded Otto Films and through the company, he co-produced, co-written & co-directed Kolumpo, a feature film released in 2013. He also served Camwerk Studios as a Creative Consultant to help developed The Kidnap Case of Ammar Affendi and secured a co-production deal with RexMedia (US) at the Marche Du Film at Festival De Cannes at the same year. He was later appointed as the Brand Ambassador for Edwin Denim Malaysia and also the face of local fashion designer Fairuz Ramdhan.

2016–present: Going regional
In 2016, Palarae starred in a Malaysian sports football film Ola Bola, Chiu Keng Guan's latest film after the record-breaking The Journey. Not only that the film made RM15.85 million and became the 5th highest-grossing Malaysian film of all time, Bront also won the Kuala Lumpur Critics' Choice Award 2016 in the Best Supporting category, for his role in the film.

After winning the Best Actor award for Terbaik Dari Langit at the Asean International Film Festivals (AIFFA) 2015, he was roped in for HBO Asia's original series titled Halfworlds directed by Indonesian filmmaker, Joko Anwar. He later joined the Mo Brothers on their latest film titled Headshot, starring Iko Uwais. In 2016, Palarae joined the cast of comedy film My Stupid Boss as a collaboration with another Indonesian filmmaker, Upi Avianto.

At the recent 2016 Asian Television Award, Palarae was nominated for his role in the telemovie Eropah, Here I am through the "Best Actor In A Leading Role" category.

Bront later appeared on Pengabdi Setan (Satan's Slave), a remake of classic Indonesian horror film by Joko Anwar. This would be his second collaboration with Joko after HBO Asia's Halfworlds series. Pengabdi Setan became the highest-grossing film in Indonesia for 2017 and being distributed in 26 countries under CJ Entertainment (Korea). They later made two films together, Gundala in 2019 & Pengabdi Setan 2: Communion

In 2020, he won the Best Actor award at 25th Asian Television Awards (ATA) ''  for his role as Inspektor Megat in the asian adaptation of The Bridge series.

He also starred in an adventure drama Edge of the World, directed by Michael Haussman and starring Jonathan Rhys Meyers as the British soldier and adventurer James Brooke (1803–1868), the first White Rajah of Sarawak.

Humanitarian work
In 2012, Palarae joined the AQSA2Gaza11 Emergency Relief trip to Gaza organised by Aqsa Syarif, a Malaysian non-governmental organisation that focuses on helping the people of Palestine affected by the Gaza-Israel conflicts occurring that year.

He was the goodwill ambassadors for the UNICEF's My Promise To Children campaign to emphasise children's rights in Malaysia.

Filmography

Film

Television series

Telemovie

Television

TV commercials

Videography

Music video

Awards and nominations

References

External links 
 
 Bront Palarae profile at Sinema Malaysia

1978 births
Living people
Malaysian male film actors
Malaysian male television actors
Malaysian people of Malay descent
Malaysian people of Pakistani descent
Malaysian people of Thai descent
Malaysian expatriates in Indonesia
People from Kedah
20th-century Malaysian male actors
21st-century Malaysian male actors